The Florida crowned snake (Tantilla relicta) is a species of colubrid snake endemic to Florida. It is a small, slender, non-venomous snake that is rarely seen. The species is commonly found in north and central Florida, and is most often associated with sandy habitats.

Description
The Florida crowned snake is a small, 7-9 inch (17-22 cm), slender snake that is tan, light brown or reddish brown in color. It has a   brown-black head, chin, and parts of the neck.  Some individuals have a pattern on the head of a pale band. The band marking may be absent in individuals from north-central Florida.  It can also have a dark neck band. The  underside can be white, pink or whitish-yellow. The maximum recorded total length of the species is 24 cm (9.5 in). The nose may be cream-tan in color in populations found along the Atlantic Coast.

Natural habitat

The Florida crowned snake is commonly found in north and central Florida, and in sandy habitat areas of the Gulf coast. The species is seen rarely in the southernmost border area of Georgia. It is most often associated with sandy habitats, including Florida sand pine scrub, pine flatwoods and pine hammocks.

Behavior and diet
The snake is most active in the warmest months of the year. During the winter, the Florida crowned snake spends the majority of its time burrowed in loose, sandy soils, including mounds created by burrowing animals. They also will hide under rocks or organic litter. They are rarely seen out in the open. They have been observed occupying pocket gopher and gopher tortoise burrows. Diet includes worms, snails, spiders, insects and their larvae. The snake has been observed eating beetle larvae. The populations found primarily in Florida have very large rear teeth that possibly direct venom into their prey. The species is harmless to humans.

Reproduction
Very little is known about the reproduction of the Florida crowned snake. The species lays elongated eggs. It is believed that its reproduction is probably similar to the genus Tantilla. It is assumed that the snake lays its eggs from late spring to August.

Predators and defense
The Florida crowned snake is eaten by a large variety of predators with the ability to find and apprehend the snake underground. The snake will not bite when it is picked up by humans. This species is the primary food for the rare short-tailed snake (Lampropeltis extenuata).

Taxonomy
Three subspecies are recognized, including the nominotypical subspecies.  The subspecific name, neilli, is in honor of American herpetologist Wilfred T. Neill.

Tantilla relicta neilli Telford, 1966
Tantilla relicta pamlica Telford, 1966
Tantilla relicta relicta Telford, 1966

Conservation
"The Florida crowned snake is not considered a conservation risk in Florida. Some populations of this species are threatened when their habitat is damaged or destroyed. It is listed as critically impaired in Georgia because of its small range in the state. This species is protected in the state of Georgia.

References

Further reading
Telford, Sam Rountree, Jr. (1966). "Variation among the southeastern crowned snakes, genus Tantilla ". Bulletin of the Florida State Museum 10 (7): 261–304. ("Tantilla relicta new species", pp. 270–271).

Colubrids
Reptiles described in 1966